Koyra is an upazila of the Khulna District of Bangladesh. It's the 2nd largest Upazila in Bangladesh.

Water bodies Main rivers: dharla, pasur, arpangachhia, Taldhup, Malancha, kobadak, ball; Koyra canal is notable.

History

Koyra's history most likely dates as far back as the office of Khan Jahan Ali in the 15th century at least. This is evident from the ancient mosques found in Koyra such as Masjidkur.

The Channir Chak L.C. Collegiate School was established in 1935. In 1962, the Koyra Madinabad Secondary School was established.

During the Bangladesh Liberation War of 1971, a sub-sector of Sector 9 was founded in Koyra's Amati Union known as Bachharbari-Manoranjan Camp, and so most of the Mukti Bahini's and Mujib Bahini's operations were launched from here. The Bengali freedom fighters built five camps in Koyra; World Poet Camp led by Abd al-Latif, Najmul Camp led by KM Mujibur Rahman, Nazrul Camp led by Abd al-Hakim, Narayan Camp led by Keramat Ali, Shaykh Abd al-Jalil and Shamsur Rahman in Jhileghata and the Suhrawardy Camp led by Rezaul Karim in Bamiya, Bagali Union. In Jaygirmahal, Dr Rafiqul Islam ran a secret medical centre to provide treatment to wounded freedom fighters. A mass grave was found in Launch Ghat, Marighata.

On 19 November 1979, Korya was established as a thana. It was upgraded to an upazila (sub-district) on 7 November 1983.

The Upazila suffered heavy damage following the Cyclone Sidr in 2007 and Cyclone Aila two years after that.

Geography 
It has 28,061 households and a total area 1775.41 km2.

Demographics 
According to the 2011 Bangladesh census, Koyra had a population of 193,931. Among them 49.68% were male and 50.32%were female. The population aged 18 or over was 80,830. Koyra had an average literacy rate of 50.4% (7+ years), compared to the national average of 72.8%.

The upazila is home to Bengali Muslims primarily as well a very large Bengali Hindu community and the other small ethnic groups such as the Mahato and the Munda people who reside in the Koyra Sadar Union and Uttar Bedkashi Union.

Administration 
Koyra Thana was formed in 1980 and it was turned into an upazila in 1983.Koyra Upazila is divided into seven union parishads: Amadi, Bagali, Dakshin Bedkashi, Koyra, Moharajpur, Moheswaripur Union, and Uttar Bedkashi Union. The union parishads are subdivided into 71 mauzas and 133 villages.

List of chairmen

Facilities 
The upazila has three orphanages: Haji Rahim Orphanage, Qadi Kabir ad-Din Orphanage and Haji Qamar ad-Din Orphanage.

Notable people
 Ruman Shana, archer
 Shah Md. Ruhul Quddus, politician

See also 
 Upazilas of Bangladesh
 Districts of Bangladesh
 Divisions of Bangladesh

References

 
Khulna Division